Encounter with Life (Swedish: Möte med livet) is a 1952 Swedish drama film directed by Gösta Werner and starring Doris Svedlund, Per Oscarsson and Arnold Sjöstrand. It was shot at the Råsunda Studios in Stockholm and location shooting in Nyköping. The film's sets were designed by the art director Nils Svenwall.

Synopsis
Gun and Robert are in love with each other, but while he is away doing military service they both have relationships with others. She falls pregnant and then miscarries, while he contracts syphilis. In spite of this they work to forge a successful marriage when he returns.

Cast
 Doris Svedlund as 	Gun
 Per Oscarsson as 	Robert
 Arnold Sjöstrand as Dr. Almer
 Britta Billsten as 	Karin
 Märta Dorff as  Östermalmsdam som genomför aborter
 Sif Ruud as 	Mrs. Jakobsson
 Lars Ekborg as Klas
 Arne Ragneborn as 	Göran
 Ingrid Thulin as 	Viola
 Peter Lindgren as 	Gun's Friend
 Kjerstin Dellert as 	Singer
 Björn Berglund as 	Clerk
 Bengt Blomgren as Sven
 Margit Carlqvist as 	Klas' Girlfriend
 Yvonne Lombard as 	Woman-friend
 Kurt-Olof Sundström as 	Kurt

References

Bibliography 
 Qvist, Per Olov & von Bagh, Peter. Guide to the Cinema of Sweden and Finland. Greenwood Publishing Group, 2000.

External links 
 

1952 films
Swedish drama films
1952 drama films
1950s Swedish-language films
Films directed by Gösta Werner
Swedish black-and-white films
1950s Swedish films